is a Japanese actor. He has appeared in more than 40 films since 1974.

Filmography

Film

Television

References

External links 

1951 births
Living people
Japanese male film actors
Actors from Fukuoka Prefecture
People from Chikugo, Fukuoka